Bumbești-Pițic is a commune in Gorj County, Oltenia, Romania. It is composed of three villages: Bumbești-Pițic, Cârligei and Poienari.

References

Communes in Gorj County
Localities in Oltenia